Sky Dylan Dayton (born August 8, 1971) is an American entrepreneur and investor. He is the founder of Internet service provider EarthLink, co-founder of eCompanies, and the founder of Boingo.

Early life
Dayton's father was the sculptor Wendell Dayton, and his mother is Alice Pero, a poet and flutist. Shortly after his birth in New York City, the family moved to Los Angeles. He lived for a time with his maternal grandfather, David DeWitt, an IBM Fellow, who played a large part in introducing Dayton to technology.

At the age of 9, he got his first computer, a Sinclair ZX81, which he used to learn programming in BASIC. At 16, Dayton graduated from The Delphian School, a private boarding school in Oregon, which uses study methods developed by L. Ron Hubbard. He wanted to be an animator but was rejected when he applied to CalArts (the California Institute for the Arts), saying he was too young at the time. Instead, Dayton got an entry-level job at a Burbank, California, advertising firm and three months later headed the graphics department. He moved to a larger advertising agency, Mednick & Associates, where he held a similar role until he was 18.

Entrepreneurial career 
Dayton started his first business in 1990 at age 19. He and a friend raised money from family and friends to open Mocha Gallery (later Cafe Mocha), an art gallery and coffee house in Los Angeles. While managing Cafe Mocha, Dayton and friend Adam Wicks Walker opened Dayton/Walker Design in 1992, a Studio City advertising and design firm, serving entertainment clients including Fox Television, Disney, Columbia Pictures, Sony Pictures, and Warner Brothers.

In 1993, after initially having great difficulties getting his Macintosh computer to access the Internet, Dayton said that he realized that the Internet was likely to become the next mass communications medium. In an article in Vanity Fair, Dayton described his earliest interest in the Internet and its business potential:

In 1994, Dayton founded EarthLink, an Internet service provider (ISP) that would offer Internet access to the public. Kevin O'Donnell, father of a childhood friend, and Reed Slatkin became EarthLink's first financial backers. Other investors followed, including Greg B. Abbott, former AT&T CFO Robert Kavner, Chip Lacy, and eventually larger investors such as George Soros.

By the summer of 1995, EarthLink reached an agreement with UUNET allowing it to provide service nationwide. By 1996, the company was growing at a rate of 5–10% a week. Dayton transitioned his title from founding CEO to executive chairman, handing over day-to-day operations of the company to Charles "Garry" Betty. A long-time Mac user, Dayton led the creation of a strategic partnership with Steve Jobs at Apple in 1998 that made EarthLink the default ISP pre-loaded on the iMac. This arrangement led to a $200 million investment by Apple in EarthLink. EarthLink  grew to become the second largest U.S. Internet service providers, after AOL, with more than four million customers and over $1 billion in annual revenue.

In June 1999, Dayton's title changed again, this time to non-executive chairman of EarthLink. He formed eCompanies, an incubator and venture capital fund for developing Internet companies, with former Disney Internet chief Jake Winebaum. A privately held company, eCompanies successfully launched LowerMyBills.com, which was purchased by Experian in 2005 for $380 million and JAMDAT Mobile, which went public and was then purchased by Electronic Arts in 2005 for $680 million. Dayton and eCompanies made headlines by buying the Business.com domain name for $7.5 million, believed to be the highest price ever paid for a domain at the time, during the height of the dot com bubble; they later sold the Business.com search portal to RH Donnelly in 2007 for $345 million.

In 2001, Dayton started Boingo Wireless to address what he saw as a fragmentation problem inherent in Wi-Fi networks. Boingo aggregates Wi-Fi hotspots around the globe into a single network, and has grown into one of the largest Wi-Fi operators. Boingo filed for its IPO in January 2011, listing Dayton as owning 15% of the company. On May 4, 2011, Boingo Wireless went public selling 5,770,000 shares at $13.50, raising $77.9 million. Dayton served as Boingo's chairman until August, 2014.

In 2005, Dayton became CEO of Helio, a mobile phone joint venture of EarthLink and SK Telecom, formed with $220 million in funding from each company. At that time, Dayton resigned as chairman of EarthLink but remained a director. In January 2008, he was appointed Chairman of Helio's board of directors for the months leading up to Helio's acquisition by Virgin Mobile USA in June, 2008.

Dayton is a board member of digital education company Age of Learning, which raised $150 million in 2016 at a $1 billion valuation, and $300 million in July 2021, giving the company a $3 billion valuation.

He is an investor in and board member of Diffbot, a semantic web and structured data startup, and Artsy, an online art marketplace, which raised a reported $50 million in July, 2017. Dayton said of the art market and company, “only very few people who could afford to buy [art] are doing so. Many are held back by high barriers to entry, which Artsy is solving.”

He is an investor in Joby Aviation, a NASA LeapTech participant building an electric vertical take-off and landing aircraft, which raised $100 million from Intel, JetBlue and Toyota in February, 2018 and went public in August, 2021, at a value of $6.6 billion.

Dayton was an early investor in video doorbell company Ring, which was acquired by Amazon in February, 2017 for $1 billion

Dayton is a co-founder of City Storage Systems and CloudKitchens, which in March, 2018 secured a $150 million investment from Uber founder Travis Kalanick, who also joined the company as its CEO, with plans as of February, 2019, to expand into China.

In January, 2019, Dayton led the Series A investment in micro satellite startup Swarm Technologies, along with PayPal co-founder David Sacks. About the investment, Dayton said, “Swarm’s approach reminds me of the early years at EarthLink—stay super scrappy, serve customers and generate revenue quickly.” Swarm was acquired by SpaceX in August, 2021, in a transaction described as "a rare deal by Elon Musk’s space company that expands the team — and possibly the technological capabilities — of its growing Starlink internet service."

Politics and social advocacy
Dayton has identified himself as a libertarian and has listed authors Henry Hazlitt, Frederic Bastiat, and Ayn Rand as significant influences, stating, “It never occurred to me to go to the government for a solution. It seems barbaric. A medieval solution to a Net-age problem.”

In 2011, he co-hosted an event to support then Deputy Mayor and Independent candidate Austin Beutner in the Los Angeles mayoral election, 2013.

Other activities and awards 
He was chosen as Entrepreneur of the Year in 1999 by the Lloyd Greif Center at the University of Southern California's Marshall School of Business. In 1999, Dayton was named to the MIT Technology Review TR100, a list of the top 100 innovators in the world under the age of 35, and in 2010 was a recipient of the Dream Keeper award from the I Have a Dream Foundation.

In 2007, Dayton served on the advisory board of the Center for Public Leadership at the John F. Kennedy School of Government at Harvard University.

Personal life
Dayton is a surfer, amateur poker player, and airplane pilot.

Dayton is married to novelist Arwen Elys Dayton. They have three children and live in the Pacific Northwest.

References

Further reading

Rose, Frank (March 2006), "Sky Dayton Gets Mobile". Wired Magazine, pp. 154–162.
Young, Shawn (October 26, 2005), "EarthLink, SK Telecom Dial In to Data Venture". The Wall Street Journal, p. B4.
"EarthLink Inc.: Wireless Joint Venture Is Signed With South Korea's SK Telecom". (January 27, 2005). The Wall Street Journal, p. D6.
Ankeny, Jason (March 2005), "Sky Dayton's Newest Next Big Thing (Again)". Wireless Review, pp. 45–50.
"Surfing Book of Records: Most Enterprising Surfer". (October 2004). Surfing Magazine, p. 66.
Dayton, Sky (May 2003). "Education in the Internet Age". Imprimis, pp. 1–5.
Dayton, Sky (March 25, 2002). "When Capital Corrupts". Forbes ASAP.
 Helio: About Helio: Meet our leaders: Sky Dayton's Bio. Retrieved May 9, 2006
McGarvey, Robert J. (January 1998), "Sky's The Limit". Entrepreneur.com.
I Have a Dream Foundation Dream Keeper Award Recipient (February 2010). 
EarthLink, Inc. company profile, fundinguniverse.com 
Warren Bennis Leadership Circle, Center for Public Leadership, John F. Kennedy School of Government, Harvard University
Sky Dayton, Jennifer Garner, Dave Winfield—I Have a Dream Foundation Gospel Brunch, House of Blues

External links 
Sky Dayton's blog

Selected speeches, writings and interviews

When Capital Corrupts Forbes (2002)
Education in the Internet Age Speech at Hillsdale College (2003) published in Imprimis

1971 births
Living people
Harvard Kennedy School people
American computer businesspeople
American libertarians
American Scientologists